The FK Baku 2006-07 season was Baku's ninth Azerbaijan Premier League season, it was their first, and only, season with Boyukagha Hajiyev as their manager. They finished the season in 3rd place.

Squad

Transfers

Summer

In:

Out:

Winter

In:

Out:

Competitions

Azerbaijan Premier League

Results
Source:

Table

Azerbaijan Cup

UEFA Champions League

First qualifying round

Squad statistics

Appearances and goals

|-
|colspan="14"|Players away from Baku on loan:

|-
|colspan="14"|Players who appeared for Baku that left during the season:

|}

Goal Scorers

References
FK Gäncä was excluded from the league.
Qarabağ have played their home games at the Tofiq Bahramov Stadium since 1993 due to the ongoing situation in Quzanlı.

FC Baku seasons
Baku